The following is a list of European Boxing Union female champions. The European Boxing Union (EBU) is a professional boxing governing body that sanctions championship bouts in Europe.

Heavyweight

Cruiserweight

Light-heavyweight

Super-middleweight

Middleweight

Super-welterweight

Welterweight

Super-lightweight

Lightweight

Super-featherweight

Featherweight

Super-bantamweight

Bantamweight

Super-flyweight

Flyweight

Light-flyweight

Strawweight

See also 

List of European Boxing Union champions

References

External links 

European Boxing Union official website

Lists of women boxers
Female
Lists of boxing champions